Yasser Anwar Corona Delgado (born 28 July 1987) is a  Mexican former professional footballer and current manager of the Mexico national under-18 team.

Career
Corona was born in Tepic. He started his Primera career with Morelia, and was signed by Chiapas on 16 May 2010, having made 24 Primera appearances for Chiapas.

He announced his retirement on April 30, 2018, because of an injury that occurred in 2017.

Personal life
Corona is of Palestinian descent.

Career statistics

International

Honours
Mexico
CONCACAF Gold Cup: 2015

References

External links

Living people
Footballers from Nayarit
1987 births
Sportspeople from Tepic, Nayarit
Atlético Morelia players
Chiapas F.C. footballers
Club Puebla players
San Luis F.C. players
Querétaro F.C. footballers
Club Tijuana footballers
2015 CONCACAF Gold Cup players
Copa América Centenario players
Mexico international footballers
Mexican people of Palestinian descent
Association football defenders
CONCACAF Gold Cup-winning players
Mexican footballers